Latresne is a commune in the Gironde department in Nouvelle-Aquitaine in southwestern France. The 20th-century French jurist and Islamologist Georges-Henri Bousquet (1900–1978) died in Latresne.

Population

See also
Château de Malherbes
Communes of the Gironde department

References

Communes of Gironde